The Jean-Marc Vallée DGC Discovery Award is an annual Canadian award, presented by the Directors Guild of Canada to honour works by emerging filmmakers.

Presented for the first time in 2016, the award is given primarily to filmmakers making their first or second feature films in any genre; however, more established filmmakers are also eligible for their first film outside their usual genre, such as a narrative filmmaker making their first documentary film or vice versa. An initial longlist of between 10 and 15 nominees is announced, which is then reduced to a shortlist of four to six films, before the award is presented at the annual DGC award gala.

Formerly presented as the DGC Discovery Award, it was renamed in 2022 in memory of director Jean-Marc Vallée following his death in December 2021.

Winners and nominees

References

Directors Guild of Canada awards
Directorial debut film awards